The Ukrainian frigate Mykolaiv was a former Soviet frigate (guard ship) Bezukoriznennyy of the   (NATO codename: Krivak I) ship built for the Soviet Navy in the late 1970s.

Service history

Ukrainian service
In summer of 1997 during the division of the Black Sea fleet she was transferred to the Ukrainian Navy, receiving the name of Mykolaiv.

Fate
Mykolaiv was decommissioned in 2001 and was cut into pieces at Vtorchermet in 2001.

See also
 Ukrainian frigate Dnipropetrovsk

References

External links
  Bditelnyy-type guard ships Krivak-I class (СТОРОЖЕВЫЕ КОРАБЛИ ТИПА "БДИТЕЛЬНЫЙ" Проект 1135 "Буревестник").

Krivak-class frigates of the Ukrainian Navy
1978 ships
Ships built at the Zalyv Shipbuilding yard
Ships built in the Soviet Union
Mykolaiv
Cold War frigates of the Soviet Union